Wyberba is a rural locality in the Southern Downs Region, Queensland, Australia. In the  Wyberba had a population of 71 people.

History 
Wyberba Provisional School opened on 1917. Later it became Wyberba State School. It closed on 10 December 1976.

In the  Wyberba had a population of 71 people.

References 

Southern Downs Region
Localities in Queensland